Vilarinho is a Belo Horizonte Metro station on Line 1 which serves as the north terminus of the line. It was opened 20 September 2002 as a one-station extension of the line from Floramar. The adjacent station is Floramar.

References

Belo Horizonte Metro stations
2002 establishments in Brazil
Railway stations opened in 2002